Richard Wendell Reichle (November 23, 1896 – June 13, 1967) was a professional baseball player who appeared in 128 games for the Boston Red Sox of Major League Baseball (MLB) during the 1922 and 1923 seasons. Reichle was also a college football player, and played in the National Football League (NFL) during the 1923 season.

Biography
Reichle was a native of Lincoln, Illinois; he first attended Lincoln College, and later the University of Illinois. His college career was interrupted by service in the United States Navy during World War I; he played for the 1918 Great Lakes Navy Bluejackets football team that won the 1919 Rose Bowl. Reichle was also a member of the 1919 Illinois Fighting Illini football team.

In a short professional baseball career, 1922 to 1924, Reichle was primarily an outfielder who also played some games as a first baseman. He appeared in 164 minor league games and 128 major league games.

Reichle's major league debut was on September 19, 1922, appearing for the Boston Red Sox against the Cleveland Indians; he went hitless in four at bats in a 7–4 loss. Reichle got his first major league hit the next day, singling against George Uhle of the Indians in a 5–2 loss. With the 1922 Red Sox, Reichle went 6-for-24 for a .250 batting average in six games with Boston.

Reichle played in 122 games with the 1923 Red Sox, a team that compiled a 61–91 record. On April 20, 1923, Reichle hit the only home run of his career, coming off of Waite Hoyt of the New York Yankees; it was also the first home run hit by a visiting player at Yankee Stadium, which had officially opened two days earlier. For the season, Reichle batted .258 with 39 RBIs.

Overall, Reichle appeared in 128 major league games, all with the Red Sox, recording a .257 batting average with one home run and 39 RBIs. In 101 defensive appearances (99 in the outfield, 2 at first base) he posted a .978 fielding average.

Reichle played in six games with the 1923 Milwaukee Badgers of the National Football League at right end. He was a second-team selection to the 1923 All-Pro Team by Collyer's Eye.

After his brief professional sports career, Reichle pursued a career in insurance. Per his April 1942 draft registration card, he was employed by Investors Syndicate (present-day Ameriprise Financial) in St. Louis. Reichle died at the age of 70 in Richmond Heights, Missouri, a suburb of St. Louis.

Notes

References

Further reading

External links
 
 

1896 births
1967 deaths
American football ends
Major League Baseball outfielders
Boston Red Sox players
Great Lakes Navy Bluejackets football players
Illinois Fighting Illini football players
Evansville Evas players
Hartford Senators players
Milwaukee Badgers players
Mobile Bears players
San Antonio Bears players
United States Navy personnel of World War I
Lincoln College (Illinois) alumni
People from Lincoln, Illinois
Players of American football from Illinois
Baseball players from Illinois